The 2006 WNBA Finals was the championship series of the 2006 WNBA season, and the conclusion of the season's playoffs. The Detroit Shock, second-seeded champions of the Eastern Conference, defeated the Sacramento Monarchs, second-seeded champions of the Western Conference, three games to two in a best-of-five series. This was Detroit's second title.

The Shock made their second appearance in the Finals in four years. The Monarchs appeared in the Finals for the second straight time after having won the title in 2005.

Going into the series, the Shock had won one championship, as had the Monarchs. The Houston Comets hold the record with four championships won.

The Shock's 23–11 record gave them home court advantage over Sacramento (21–13), but a Mariah Carey concert meant that the fifth and deciding game had to be moved to Joe Louis Arena in downtown Detroit.

Road to the finals

Regular season series
The Shock and the Monarchs split the regular season series:

Game summaries
All times listed below are Eastern Daylight Time.

Game 1

Kara Lawson led a balanced attack with 22 points as the Monarchs posted an impressive 95-71 victory over the Detroit Shock in Game 1 of the WNBA Finals. Sacramento, which set a WNBA Finals record for points, field goals (35) and 3-pointers (ten), took the early edge in the best-of-five series.

Cheryl Ford scored 25 points and Katie Smith added 21 for Detroit, which is seeking its second title in four years. The Shock certainly will not get there committing a Finals-record 24 turnovers as they did in Game 1.

Sacramento officially took charge of the contest with an 8–0 run during the third quarter that turned a 13-point lead into a 61-40 bulge with 6:09 to play. Nicole Powell ignited the surge with a 3-pointer and Griffith made a pair of baskets before Ticha Penicheiro capped the run with a free throw.

The Shock got within 76–62 midway through the fourth quarter, but Lawson came off the bench to hit three 3-pointers as the Monarchs extended their cushion to 91–71 with 2:57 remaining. Lawson finished 6-of-8 from the arc, setting a Finals record for made 3-pointers. Powell connected on 4-of-7 attempts as Sacramento finished 10-of-19 from long range.

Game 2

Deanna Nolan scored 21 points and Smith added 16 – all in the second half – as the Shock rebounded from a slow start to even the best-of-three series with a 73–63 victory in Game 2 of the WNBA Finals.

Swin Cash collected 11 points, eight rebounds and five assists for Detroit, which gave Sacramento (5–1) its first loss of the postseason and avoided falling into an 0–2 hole.

Trailing by nine at the half and 54–48 entering the final period, the Shock were on the verge of being one game away from a Finals' loss. However, after scoring the last three points of the third quarter, Detroit ran off the first eight points of the frame. A jumper by Nolan capped the spurt and gave the Shock the lead for good, 56–54, with 7:43 left.

After Detroit maintained the edge over the next five minutes, Katie Smith made it 67–58 on a 3-pointer with 2:57 to go.

Game 3

Yolanda Griffith scored 15 points, and Nicole Powell added 14, as the Monarchs took control of the WNBA Finals with an 89–69 rout of the Detroit Shock in Game 3. Capturing its 11th consecutive home playoff victory, Sacramento improved its home record in the postseason to 12–2 (.857), the best mark in league history.

On the way to claiming their first title last season, the Monarchs stole home-court advantage from the Connecticut Sun and then captured both home games to complete the series in four games. So far, that has been the same blueprint Sacramento has used to take control of this series. After setting a Finals record for points in a 95–71 victory in the opener in Detroit on Wednesday, the Monarchs dismantled the Shock to move within a win here of a second consecutive title.

Despite failing to capitalize on a six-point lead entering the fourth quarter of Game 2 in a 73–63 loss, Sacramento came out fired up, using a 9–0 run at the start of the second quarter to pull ahead, 29–18, with 7:46 to play. Rookie Scholanda Dorrell sank a pair of three-pointers during the burst. Griffith, the MVP of last season's Finals, scored her team's final eight points before the half to maintain an 11-point edge at the break, 44–33.

Game 4

Katie Smith and Cheryl Ford carried the load to help the Detroit Shock extend the WNBA Finals to a decisive fifth game.

Smith scored 22 points and Ford added 13 with 10 rebounds as the Shock avoided elimination by posting a 72–52 triumph over the defending champion Sacramento Monarchs.

Rebounding from Sunday's 89–69 loss in Game 3, Detroit ended Sacramento's 11-game home playoff winning streak and will host the final game of the series on Saturday. Each of the previous league champions clinched the title on its home floor.

Game 5

Katie Smith scored 17 points, including two clutch jumpers in the final two minutes, as the Detroit Shock claimed their second title with a stirring 80–75 victory over the Sacramento Monarchs.

The Shock, who also won the title in 2003, won the last two games of the best-of-five series and dethroned the Monarchs, who were trying to become the league's third repeat champion. Instead, Detroit joined Houston (1997–2000) and Los Angeles (2001–02) as multiple championship winners.

Deanna Nolan scored 24 points and was named Finals MVP. Nolan scored 10 points in the pivotal third quarter, when the Shock held the Monarchs to nine points and took the lead for good.

A 3-pointer by Nolan gave Detroit a 68–55 lead before Sacramento made a final charge, closing to 75–69 on a 3-pointer by Kristin Haynie with 2:05 remaining. Smith answered with a 3-pointer 19 seconds later.

A three-point play by Haynie and 3-pointer by foul-plagued Nicole Powell pulled the Monarchs within 78–75 with 33 seconds to play. Sacramento elected not to foul but Smith foiled the strategy by draining a 15-footer with 14 seconds remaining.

Smith grabbed a last-gasp shot and hurled the ball skyward in celebration. She is the all-time leading scorer in women's professional basketball history and a former WNBA scoring champion, but she never had been on a championship team – until now.

Awards
2006 WNBA Champion: Detroit Shock	
Finals MVP: Deanna Nolan

Rosters

{| class="toccolours" style="font-size: 95%; width: 100%;"
|-
! colspan="2" style="background-color: #00008B; color: #D3D3D3; text-align: center;" | 2006 Detroit Shock Finals roster
|- style="background-color: #DC143C;color: #FFFFFF; text-align: center;"
! Players !! Coaches
|-
| valign="top" |
{| class="sortable" style="background:transparent; margin:0px; width:100%;"
! Pos. !! # !! Nat. !! Name !! Height !! Weight !!class="unsortable"| !! From
|-

{| class="toccolours" style="font-size: 95%; width: 100%;"
|-
! colspan="2" style="background-color: #483B8D; color: #FFFFFF; text-align: center;" | 2006 Sacramento Monarchs Finals roster
|- style="background-color: #483B8D;color: #FFFFFF; text-align: center;"
! Players !! Coaches
|-
| valign="top" |
{| class="sortable" style="background:transparent; margin:0px; width:100%;"
! Pos. !! # !! Nat. !! Name !! Height !! Weight !!class="unsortable"| !! From
|-

Finals
Detroit Shock
Sacramento Monarchs
WNBA Finals
WNBA Finals
Women's National Basketball Association Finals
Basketball competitions in Detroit
21st century in Sacramento, California
Basketball competitions in California
WNBA Finals
Women's sports in California
Sports competitions in Sacramento, California